The Maine–New Hampshire men's ice hockey rivalry, sometimes referred to as the Border War, is a men's ice hockey rivalry between the Maine Black Bears and New Hampshire Wildcats. The proximity of the two states, the success of the two programs, and their history in high-profile games have caused one of the most intense rivalries in American college hockey. College Hockey News has ranked it as the seventh best Division I college hockey rivalry.

History
The two teams first played in 1979. In the early 1990s, Maine dominated, winning 18 out of 19 games in one stretch. The rivalry came to a head in 1999. UNH and Maine played a two-game series to finish the regular season at the Whittemore Center. UNH had to win the series to clinch the top seed in the Hockey East playoffs, and swept the two-game series. The two teams met again a month later in the 1999 national championship. Although Maine took an early lead in the game, UNH came from behind to force overtime. Maine then won in overtime.

Though Maine leads the series, it has been relatively even since 1999. Three years after Maine's victory in the national title game UNH won its first Hockey East title with a victory over Maine. Maine gained revenge for this loss several weeks later, however, by defeating UNH in the 2002 Frozen Four. The series became very evenly matched for some time, before UNH became more dominant in the late 2000s and won 6 games in a row over two seasons. In 2012 Maine and UNH played in a Winter Classic type game and Maine won 5–4 in overtime at Fenway Park, after giving up the first 2 goals. Maine's ice hockey program has been more successful overall than UNH, having won two national titles and five Hockey East titles while UNH has won two Hockey East titles and has not won a national championship.

Traditions
One factor that contributes to the intensity of the rivalry is the similarity of the two states. Fans of each program often work together and frequent the same restaurants in places such as Portsmouth, New Hampshire and Kittery, Maine. The two programs also recruit many of the same potential players from New England, though there are often very few New Hampshire natives on UNH's team and few Maine natives on Maine's team.

In 1999 UNH began asking their fans to dress in white each time Maine traveled to the Whittemore Center in what they dubbed "White out the Whit" nights. The student tickets for these games sell out faster than any others. Maine supporters often refer to UNH as the "University of No Hardware" due to their lack of championships. During one series in Maine, Maine fans pelted visiting UNH fans with snowballs. UNH fans often raise the issue of NCAA violations committed by Maine under Shawn Walsh. They have also brought newspapers to the games to read while Maine's starting lineup is being introduced. The two schools have announced plans to move two of their games each year to the last week of the regular season.

In addition to ice hockey, UNH and Maine are considered rivals in basketball and football as well.

Game results

† Hockey East Tournament

Results by decade

See also
Green Line Rivalry

References

http://bangordailynews.com/2012/01/07/sports/maine-unh-battle-at-frozen-fenway/

External links
"White out the Whit" 2011 official video (Flash required)

College ice hockey rivalries in the United States
Maine Black Bears men's ice hockey
New Hampshire Wildcats men's ice hockey